Dr. Morella Joseph is a politician in the Caribbean island nation of Saint Lucia and was reportedly the first woman in its history to become president of a political party. After the unexpected resignation of Vaughan Lewis, Joseph was elected to the position in October 2000 and became the leader of Saint Lucia's United Workers' Party. In the elections of the same year, Morella she ran for a seat in the Parliament of Saint Lucia but was defeated by the candidate of the Saint Lucia Labour Party.

See also 
 United Workers' Party (Saint Lucia)
 Politics of Saint Lucia

References

External links
Biography available in   Political Leaders of The United Workers Party of Saint Lucia

Year of birth missing (living people)
Living people
United Workers Party (Saint Lucia) politicians
20th-century Saint Lucian women politicians
21st-century Saint Lucian women politicians
21st-century Saint Lucian politicians